Margaret Ruth Springford (September 1921  November 20, 2010) was a Canadian radio, stage, television and film actress.

Springford was the daughter of Walter and Elspeth Springford. Little is known of her personal life, but it appears she never married. Her credits included the television series Hangin' In, A Gift to Last, The Frankie Howerd Show and Maggie Muggins, as well as the Jim Henson teleplay The Cube and the feature film The Changeling.

Death
Ruth Springford died at Etobicoke General Hospital, Etobicoke, Ontario, on November 20, 2010, aged 89.

Filmography
One Plus One (1961) - (segment "Baby")
5 Card Stud (1968) - Mama Malone
Sunday in the Country (1974) - Churchgoer
The Changeling (1980) - Minnie Huxley
Improper Channels (1981) - Mrs. Wharton

Awards
A longtime member of ACTRA, she received the following: 
 Andrew Allan Award
 John Drainie Award 
 ACTRA Award 
 Dora Mavor Moore Award

References

External links

Canadian stage actresses
Canadian television actresses
Canadian radio actresses
Canadian film actresses
Actresses from Toronto
1921 births
2010 deaths
Canadian Screen Award winners